Lutilabria volgensis is a moth in the family Gelechiidae. It was described by Anikin and Piskunov in 1996. It is found in Russia (the southern Ural).

The wingspan is about 15 mm. The forewings are rust-brown, without markings. The hindwings are brownish grey.

Etymology
The species is named for the region where it was first collected.

References

Lutilabria
Moths described in 1996